Salawai River is a river of Seram Island, Maluku province, Indonesia, about 2500 km northeast of the capital Jakarta.

Ecology
The river is noted for its saltwater crocodiles. Tourists can be taken up the river in longboats.

Geography
The river flows in the central northern area of Seram island with predominantly tropical rainforest climate (designated as Af in the Köppen-Geiger climate classification). The annual average temperature in the area is 23 °C. The warmest month is April, when the average temperature is around 24 °C, and the coldest is March, at 22 °C. The average annual rainfall is 3387 mm. The wettest month is July, with an average of 523 mm rainfall, and the driest is October, with 95 mm rainfall.

See also
List of rivers of Indonesia
List of rivers of Maluku (province)

References

Rivers of Seram Island
Rivers of Indonesia